Stylianos Panteli (born 7 August 1999) is a Cypriot footballer who plays for AEL Limassol as a right wing-back.

Career
On 29 January 2019, Panteli was loaned out to Latvian club FK Jelgava for the rest of the season.

References

External links

1999 births
Living people
Cypriot footballers
Cyprus youth international footballers
AEL Limassol players
Olympiakos Nicosia players
FK Jelgava players
Ermis Aradippou FC players
Nea Salamis Famagusta FC players
Cypriot First Division players
Cypriot Second Division players
Latvian Higher League players
Association football defenders
Sportspeople from Limassol